Smen (from  also called sman, semn, semneh, or sminn) is a salted, fermented butter native to North African cuisine (Algeria, Morocco and Tunisia). As well as a traditional Yemeni dish.

In Yemen, Yemenis prepare a special version of semneh (سمنة) which is smoked with aromatic herbs inside of a gourd in order to impart deeper flavour and aid in preservation. However, smen is also an important ingredient in Middle Eastern cuisine and North African cooking. It is produced using the butter made from the milk of sheep, goats or a combination of the two. The butter is brought to its boiling point for about 15 minutes, then skimmed, strained into a ceramic jar called a khabia, and salted before it curdles. Some have it as a practice to add roasted fenugreek seeds to the boiling butter, after which it is strained from the fenugreek seeds. Thyme is often added to it to provide a yeast and enzyme starter. Other plants or fruits can be used. The result is then aged, often in sealed containers. It is then traditionally buried in the ground for temperature stability purposes, just like cheese is left to mature in caves because they have cooler and more stable temperatures.

It is similar to ghee and niter kibbeh, but has a characteristically strong, rancid, and cheesy taste and smell. Matured smen is very similar in taste to blue cheese as it is a high-fat form of cheese. The older the smen, the stronger—and more valued—it becomes. Smen is traditionally used mainly in the preparation of couscous and trid, as well as of tagines and kdras, although it has become more difficult to find due to an increased replacement by peanut oil, a non-native culinary element introduced from Senegal and other West African countries.

Smen made during winter is believed to be more fragrant than those made during a warmer season. In constant warm weather, closer to the temperature where butter becomes liquid, smen matures very slowly. In lower temperatures, one month is considered an acceptable time to start using the smen in cooking, although its flavour will not be strong. In constant warm weather, like in equatorial countries, it can take up to four months to develop the equivalent amount of flavour.

Smen holds great cultural significance, particularly as an indicator of familial wealth. As such it will often be used as a token of honor for esteemed visitors to a household, akin to other cultures' customs such as using the "fine china" or serving an especially prized wine.

Regional customs
Berber farmers in southern Morocco will sometimes bury a sealed vessel of smen on the day of a daughter's birth, aging it until it is unearthed and used to season the food served at that daughter's wedding.

In Yemen, the local custom was to take fresh butter and to add thereto hot water while the milk or whey was still mixed with the butter. This mixture is then taken up and put into a separate vessel where it is then brought to a boil. Immediately thereafter, they took either wheat flour or roasted and ground fenugreek seeds mixed with roasted wheat kernels, and cooked them together on a low heat. Allowed to simmer. Afterwards, the butter is then strained until one is left with a clear batch of melted butter (smen). Stored in a smoked earthenware container in a cool place.

See also
Clarified butter
Ghee
Dairy product
List of African dishes

References

References
 

Arabic words and phrases
Cooking oils
African cuisine
Algerian cuisine
Israeli cuisine
Mizrahi Jewish cuisine
Levantine cuisine
Mediterranean cuisine
Moroccan cuisine
Yemeni cuisine